Kashkakovo (Qaşqaq) is a rural locality (a village) in Shulganovsky Selsoviet, Tatyshlinsky District, Bashkortostan, Russia. The population was 481 as of 2010. There are 9 streets.

Geography 
Kashkakovo is located 42 km southwest of Verkhniye Tatyshly (the district's administrative centre) by road. Verkhny Chat is the nearest rural locality.

References 

Rural localities in Tatyshlinsky District